During the 2008–09 SV Werder Bremen season, the club finished 10th in the Bundesliga, won the DFB-Pokal, and were eliminated in the Group Stage of Champions League and the final of the UEFA Cup.

Players

First-team squad
Squad at end of season

Left club during season

Werder Bremen II

Bundesliga

Bundesliga review

Bundesliga results

Results summary

League table

DFB–Pokal

DFB–Pokal review
In the first round of the DFB-Pokal, on 17 August, Werder Bremen defeated Oberliga club Eintracht Nordhorn 9–3. Werder Bremen got four goals from Markus Rosenberg, three goals from Hugo Almeida, and two more goals from Boubacar Sanogo and Jurica Vranješ. Dennis Brode, Herion Novaku, and Bertino Nacar scored for Eintracht Nordhorn. Then in the second round, on 23 September, Werder Bremen defeated 3. Liga club Erzgebirge Aue 2–1. Fabian Müller gave Erzgebirge Aue a 1–0 lead in the seventh minute. However, Werder Bremen equalized with a 26-minute goal from Claudio Pizarro and took the lead with a 54-minute goal from Markus Rosenberg. Then in the round of 16, on 28 January, Werder Bremen defeated Borussia Dortmund 2–1.

DFB–Pokal results

Champions League

Champions League review

Werder Bremen kicked–off their Champions League campaign with a 0–0 draw against Anorthosis Famagusta on 16 September.

Champions League results

Group table

UEFA Cup

UEFA Cup review

UEFA Cup results

Team record

Player information

Squad and statistics

Discipline

Transfers

In

Out

References

Notes

SV Werder Bremen seasons
Werder Bremen